Situational Leadership Theory, or the Situational Leadership Model, is a model created by Paul Hersey and Ken Blanchard, developed while working on Management of Organizational Behavior. The theory was first introduced in 1969 as "life cycle theory of leadership". During the mid-1970s, life cycle theory of leadership was renamed "Situational Leadership Theory." 

Situational Leadership emerged as one of a related group of two-factor theories of leadership, many of which originated in research done at Ohio State University in the 1960s. These two-factor theories hold that possibilities in leadership style are composed of combinations of two main variables: task behavior and relationship behavior. Various terms are used to describe these two concepts, such as initiating structure or direction for task behavior and consideration or socioemotional support for relationship behavior. Related leadership models include Blake and Mouton's Managerial Grid and Reddin's 3D Theory.

In the late 1970s/early 1980s, Hersey and Blanchard both developed their own slightly divergent versions of the Situational Leadership Theory: the Situational Leadership Model (Hersey) and the Situational Leadership II model (Blanchard et al.).

The fundamental principle of the situational leadership model is that there is no single "best" style of leadership. Effective leadership is task-relevant, and the most successful leaders are those who adapt their leadership style to the performance readiness (ability and willingness) of the individual or group they are attempting to lead or influence. Effective leadership varies, not only with the person or group that is being influenced, but it also depends on the task, job, or function that needs to be accomplished.
 
The Situational Leadership Model has two fundamental concepts: leadership style and the individual or group's performance readiness level, also referred to as maturity level or development level.

Leadership styles
Hersey and Blanchard characterized leadership style in terms of the amount of task behavior and relationship behavior that the leader provides to their followers. They categorized all leadership styles into four behavior styles, which they named S1 to S4. The titles for three of these styles differ depending on which version of the model is used.

Of these, no one style is considered optimal for all leaders to use all the time. Effective leaders need to be flexible and must adapt themselves according to the situation.

Maturity levels
The right leadership style will depend on the person or group being led. The Hersey–Blanchard situational leadership theory identified four levels of maturity M1 through M4:

Maturity levels are also task-specific. A person might be generally skilled, confident, and motivated in their job, but would still have a maturity level M1 when asked to perform a task requiring skills they don't possess. Blanchard's Situational Leadership II makes some changes to these, relabelling all as development levels rather than maturity levels to avoid stigma around the idea of immaturity, and making some distinctions in M1 and M2, now D1 and D2 in this subsequent version.

Developing people and self-motivation
A good leader develops "the competence and commitment of their people so they're self-motivated rather than dependent on others for direction and guidance." According to Hersey's book, a leader's high, realistic expectation causes high performance of followers; a leader's low expectations lead to low performance of followers.

SLII® 
Hersey and Blanchard continued to iterate on the original theory until 1977 when they mutually agreed to run their respective companies. In the late 1970s, Hersey changed the name from "situational leadership theory" to "situational leadership."

In 1979, Ken Blanchard founded Blanchard Training & Development, Inc. (later The Ken Blanchard Companies), together with his wife Margie Blanchard and a board of founding associates. Over time, this group made changes to the concepts of the original situational leadership theory in several key areas, which included the research base, the leadership style labels, and the individual's development level continuum.

In 1985 Blanchard introduced Situational Leadership II (SLII®) in the book Leadership and the One Minute Manager: A Situational Approach to Managing People. Blanchard and his colleagues continued to iterate and revise the book.

Framework of reference
 
The situational leadership II (SLII) model acknowledged the existing research of the situational leadership theory and revised the concepts based on feedback from clients, practicing managers, and the work of several leading researchers in the field of group development.

The primary sources included:

 Malcolm Knowles' research in the area of adult learning theory and individual development stages, where he asserted that learning and growth are based on changes in self-concept, experience, readiness to learn, and orientation to learning.
 Kanfer and Ackerman's study of motivation and cognitive abilities and the difference between commitment and confidence, task knowledge and transferable skills. 
 Bruce Tuckman's research in the field of group development, which compiled the results of 50 studies on group development and identified four stages of development: forming, storming, norming, and performing. Tuckman's later work identified a fifth stage of development called "termination". Tuckman found that when individuals are new to the team or task they are motivated but are usually relatively uninformed of the issues and objectives of the team. Tuckman felt that in the initial stage (forming) supervisors of the team need to be directive. Stage two, Storming, is characterized by conflict and polarization around interpersonal issues and how best to approach the task. These behaviors serve as resistance to group influence and task requirements and can cause performance to drop. As the team moves through the stages of development, performance and productivity increase.
 Lacoursiere's research in the 1980s synthesized the findings from 238 groups. Until Lacoursiere's work in 1980, most research had studied non-work groups; Lacoursiere's work validated the findings produced by Tuckman in regard to the five stages of group development.
 Susan Wheelan's 10-year study, published in 1990 and titled Creating Effective Teams, which confirmed the five stages of group development in Tuckman's work.

Development levels
Blanchard's situational leadership II model uses the terms "competence" (ability, knowledge, and skill) and "commitment" (confidence and motivation) to describe different levels of development.

According to Ken Blanchard, "Four combinations of competence and commitment make up what we call 'development level.'"

 D1 – Enthusiastic Beginner: Low competence with high commitment
 D2 – Disillusioned Learner: Low/middling competence with low commitment
 D3 – Capable but Cautious Performer: High competence with low/variable commitment
 D4 – Self-reliant Achiever: High competence with high commitment

In order to make an effective cycle, a leader needs to motivate followers properly by adjusting their leadership style to the development level of the person. Blanchard postulates that Enthusiastic Beginners (D1) need a directing leadership style while Disillusioned Learners (D2) require a coaching style. He suggests that Capable but Cautious Performers (D3) respond best to a Supporting leadership style and Self-reliant Achievers need leaders who offer a delegating style. 

The situational leadership II model tends to view development as an evolutionary progression meaning that when individuals approach a new task for the first time, they start out with little or no knowledge, ability or skills, but with high enthusiasm, motivation, and commitment. Blanchard views development as a process as the individual moves from developing to developed, in this viewpoint it is still incumbent upon the leader to diagnose development level and then use the appropriate leadership style which can vary based on each task, goal, or assignment. 

In the Blanchard SLII model, the belief is that an individual comes to a new task or role with low competence (knowledge and transferable skills) but high commitment. As the individual gains experience and is appropriately supported and directed by their leader they reach development level 2 and gain some competence, but their commitment drops because the task may be more complex than the individual had originally perceived when they began the task. With the direction and support of their leader, the individual moves to development level 3 where competence can still be variable—fluctuating between moderate to high knowledge, ability and transferable skills and variable commitment as they continue to gain mastery of the task or role. Finally, the individual moves to development level 4 where competence and commitment are high.

Research on the model
Despite its intuitive appeal, several studies do not support the prescriptions offered by situational leadership theory. To determine the validity of the prescriptions suggested by the Hersey and Blanchard approach, Vecchio (1987) conducted a study of more than 300 high school teachers and their principals. He found that newly hired teachers were more satisfied and performed better under principals who had highly structured leadership styles, but the performance of more experienced and mature teachers was unrelated to the style their principals exhibited. In essence, the Vecchio findings suggest that in terms of situational leadership, it is appropriate to match a highly structured S1 style of leadership with immature subordinates, but it is not clear (incomplete research) whether it is appropriate to match S2, S3, or S4, respectively, with more mature subordinates. In a replication study using University employees, Fernandez and Vecchio (1997) found similar results. Taken together, these studies fail to support the basic recommendations suggested by the situational leadership model.

A 2009 study found the 2007 revised theory was a poorer predictor of subordinate performance and attitudes than the original version from 1972. Survey data collected from 357 banking employees and 80 supervisors, sampled from 10 Norwegian financial institutions, were analyzed for predicted interactions.

See also
 Contingency theory
 Three levels of leadership model
 Trait leadership

References

Resources
 Hersey, P. and Blanchard, K. H. (1977). Management of Organizational Behavior: Utilizing Human Resources (3rd ed.) New Jersey/Prentice Hall,

External links
 https://situational.com/situational-leadership/

Leadership

de:Reifegradmodell (Führungslehre)
pt:Lideranca situacional